Indy Eleven NPSL is an American soccer team based in Westfield, Indiana. The team plays in National Premier Soccer League (NPSL), a national amateur league at the fourth tier of the American Soccer Pyramid, in the Midwest Region.

The team plays its home games on the turf practice field at Grand Park in Westfield. The team's colors are red and white.

The team was initially known as the Rockford Raptors before moving to the Chicago area to become the Chicago Fire NPSL. They later moved to Indiana to become the Indiana Fire before switching their affiliation to North American Soccer League club Indy Eleven.

History
The team began as an offshoot of the Rockford Raptors organization, who were members of the old USISL in the early 1990s, and played for seven seasons in the USISL Pro League and USL Premier Development League, reaching the Conference Playoffs on two occasions before leaving the league at the end of the 2000 season.

The team re-formed in 2007 and played their first season in the National Premier Soccer League in Rockford, Illinois as the Raptors, before moving to Bridgeview prior to the 2008 season after signing a formal agreement to become an official development program for the Chicago Fire Major League Soccer programme. The Chicago Fire played through the 2011 season, ending the NPSL program.

In January 2014 the NPSL announced the addition of the Westfield Youth Soccer Association (WYSA). On May 30, 2014, WYSA merged with the Carmel United SC to form the Indiana Fire Juniors Soccer Club, a Chicago Fire Soccer Club affiliate.

Year-by-year

Head coaches
 Brian Roberts (2008–11)
 John Simmonds (2014-2016)

Stadium
 Toyota Park; Bridgeview, Illinois (2008–11)
 Grand Park; Westfield, Indiana (2014–present)

References

External links
 Indiana Fire website

Chicago Fire FC
National Premier Soccer League teams
2007 establishments in Illinois
Association football clubs established in 2007
Indy Eleven
Soccer clubs in Indiana
Reserve soccer teams in the United States
Hamilton County, Indiana